Henry George Lang  (3 March 1919 – 17 April 1997) was a New Zealand public servant, economist, university professor and company director. He was born in Vienna, Austria on 3 March 1919 and later became the step-son of the architect Ernst Plischke.

In the 1977 New Year Honours, Lang was appointed a Companion of the Order of the Bath, in recognition of his service as Secretary to the Treasury since 1969.

References

1919 births
1997 deaths
New Zealand academics
New Zealand public servants
20th-century New Zealand businesspeople
Austrian emigrants to New Zealand
Members of the Order of New Zealand
New Zealand Companions of the Order of the Bath
20th-century  New Zealand economists